Louis Posen (born 1971) is an American, Los-Angeles-based, record producer and the founder of both Hopeless Records and Sub City Records.  Posen is known as the “Paul Newman of punk rock” for his philanthropic efforts.

Early life
Born in 1971, Louis Posen grew up in Los Angeles, California, United States.  At age 15 he developed a passion for punk rock music after attending a concert by X at the Reseda Country Club.  As a child and teenager, he also had a love for film, and he enrolled at California State University, Northridge as a film studies major, hoping to eventually become a filmmaker.  However, his career plans were derailed by a diagnosis of retinitis pigmentosa at age 19, and he gravitated toward a music career.

Career
Posen founded Hopeless Records in 1993 in Van Nuys in the San Fernando Valley region of Los Angeles after filming a music video with the punk rock band Guttermouth.  He used $1,000 in savings and a self-help book on starting a record label to begin the business, which later signed bands such as The Wonder Years, Yellowcard, Avenged Sevenfold, Thrice, The Used, Taking Back Sunday, and All Time Low.  In 1999 Posen started Sub City Records, which has raised over $2.5 million for non-profit organizations, including groups that support blindness research, mental health, and suicide prevention.  As part of his quest to create awareness for suicide prevention, Posen founded the Take Action Tour.  Both Hopeless Records and Sub City Records give at least 5% of their profits to charity.

Personal life
In 1994, a botched operation on his eye left Posen legally blind.  He is married with one child.

References

1971 births
Living people
Record producers from California
California State University, Northridge alumni
People from Los Angeles
American blind people